= Aman Rathod =

Aman Rathod (born 16 June 1993) is an Indian actor and former cricketer from Vadodara, Gujarat.

Rathod won the title of Mr Vadodara in 2021. He was a runner's up in Mr Gujarat competition in the year 2022. He is a goodwill ambassador of Valiant Cricket team that support young players from remote regions of India.
